Lepidochrysops grandis is a butterfly in the family Lycaenidae. It is found on Madagascar (Tananarive and Fianarantsoa).

References

Butterflies described in 1937
Lepidochrysops
Endemic fauna of Madagascar
Butterflies of Africa